Olga Gennadyevna Turova (Ольга Геннадьевна Турова, born 13 March 1983) is a Russian former female water polo player. She was a member of the Russia women's national water polo team, playing as a centre forward.

Career 
She was a part of the  team at the 2004 Summer Olympics and 2008 Summer Olympics. 
She won the bronze medal at the 2003 World Aquatics Championships. 
She won the gold medal at the 2008 Women's European Water Polo Championship, and the bronze medal at the 2003 Women's European Water Polo Championship.

On club level she played for Yunost Volgograd in Russia.

See also
 List of World Aquatics Championships medalists in water polo

References

External links
 

1983 births
Living people
Russian female water polo players
Water polo players at the 2008 Summer Olympics
Olympic water polo players of Russia
People from Volgodonsk
Water polo players at the 2004 Summer Olympics
Sportspeople from Rostov Oblast
21st-century Russian women